Trevor Mustey (born 29 September 1963) is  a former Australian rules footballer who played with Sydney in the Victorian Football League (VFL). 		

A ruckman, Mustey was recruited from Clayton Football Club in the Federal Football League and made his VFL debut in 1982.

Notes

External links 		
		
		
		
		
		
		
Living people		
1963 births		
		
Australian rules footballers from Victoria (Australia)		
Sydney Swans players